Posht Asiab (also Romanized as Posht Āsīāb; also known as Deh-e Hasht Āsīāb-e Shapvand, Deh-e Posht Āsīāb-e Shīvand, and Deh Posht Āsyāb-e Sheyvand) is a village in Donbaleh Rud-e Shomali Rural District, Dehdez District, Izeh County, Khuzestan Province, Iran. At the 2006 census, its population was 511, in 99 families.

References 

Populated places in Izeh County